A polygon is a geometric figure.

Polygon may also refer to:

Mathematics and computing
 Simple polygon, a single contiguous closed region, the more common usage of "polygon"
 Star polygon, a star-like polygon
 Polygon (computer graphics), a representation of a polygon in computer graphics

Companies
 Polygon (blockchain)
 Polygon Bikes, an Indonesian bike company
 Polygon Books, an imprint of Birlinn Limited
 Polygon Pictures, Japanese 3DCG anime studio
 Polygon Records, a 1950s record company

Places
 Semipalatinsk Test Site, a nuclear test site near Semey, Kazakhstan
 The Polygon, Southampton, a district in the city of Southampton
 Polygon Wood, Zonnebeke, Belgium, site of the Battle of Passchendaele in World War I

Other uses
 Polygon (film) a 1977 Soviet animation film
 Polygon (website), a video game website
 POLYGON experiment, an experiment in physical oceanography which established the existence of mesoscale eddies
 Polygon Man, the former mascot for the Sony PlayStation in North America
 Polygon, a Danish magazine (pencil and paper) version of the strategy board game Hex
 Polygon, a chemical compound also known as sodium triphosphate
 Polygons, a type of patterned ground created by permafrost expanding and contracting

See also
 Poligon Creative Centre
 Polygone, an electronic warfare tactics range between Germany and France
 The Polygon (disambiguation)